James Anthony Burke (March 30, 1910 – October 13, 1983) was a United States Representative from Massachusetts from 1959 to 1979.

He was born in Boston, Massachusetts. He was educated in the Boston public schools and Lincoln Preparatory School and attended Suffolk University.

Burke was a real estate salesman, and served in appointive positions including registrar of vital statistics for the city of Boston.

He was a Democrat, and served in the Massachusetts House of Representatives from 1937 to 1939.

During World War II Burke was a special agent in Counter-intelligence, attached to the 77th Infantry Division in the South Pacific.

After the war he was again elected to the Massachusetts House, serving four terms, 1947 to 1955, and attaining the position of assistant majority leader.

He served as vice chairman of the Massachusetts Democratic State Committee for four years.  He was the unsuccessful Democratic candidate for lieutenant governor in 1954, and ran unsuccessfully for the Democratic nomination in 1956.

In 1958 Burke was elected to the Eighty-sixth Congress.  He was reelected to the nine succeeding Congresses, and served from January 3, 1959 to January 3, 1979. He rose through seniority to become the second-ranking Democrat on the Ways and Means Committee, and was considered an expert on the Social Security system.  Burke was not a candidate for reelection in 1978 to the Ninety-sixth Congress.

He was a resident of Milton, Massachusetts until his death in Boston, Massachusetts on October 13, 1983 and his interment was at Milton Cemetery in Milton, Massachusetts.

See also
 Massachusetts legislature: 1937–1938, 1947–1948, 1949–1950, 1951–1952, 1953–1954

Note
1. The 18th Suffolk District sent two representatives to the Massachusetts House of Representatives in 1939. Michael Paul Feeney and Frank J. Morrison succeeded Burke and Patrick J. Welsh.

References

External links

1910 births
1983 deaths
Politicians from Boston
Suffolk University alumni
Democratic Party members of the Massachusetts House of Representatives
People from Milton, Massachusetts
Democratic Party members of the United States House of Representatives from Massachusetts
20th-century American politicians